First American may refer to:

 A name for the first humans to settle the Americas, the ancestors of today's Native Americans
 First American, a division of the now-defunct Bank of Credit and Commerce International
 First American National Bank, now part of AmSouth Bank
 First American Corporation, a financial information services company